The 1997 film The Lost World: Jurassic Park and the closely related Michael Crichton 1995 novel of the same name provided material for a number of video games. These include:

 [[The Lost World: Jurassic Park (arcade game)|The Lost World: Jurassic Park (arcade game)]] - A light gun arcade game from Sega. It was released in 1997. It was the follow-up to Sega's 1994 rail shooter based on Jurassic Park, itself named Jurassic Park. A third video game based on Jurassic Park III was made by Konami in 2001.
 The Lost World: Jurassic Park (Sega game) - A top down action game released for the Sega Genesis in which the player takes the role of a bounty hunter attempting to capture various dinosaurs over a number of missions. Developed by Appaloosa Interactive and published by Sega in 1997.
 [[The Lost World: Jurassic Park (console game)|The Lost World: Jurassic Park (console game)]] - An action video game released in 1997 for the Sega Saturn and Sony PlayStation. Developed by DreamWorks Interactive and published by Electronic Arts, The Lost World: Jurassic Park is based on both the novel and the film. A year later a special edition of the game was released for the Sony PlayStation as a part of their Greatest Hits line-up and featured several modifications to the game play.
 [[The Lost World: Jurassic Park (handheld game)|The Lost World: Jurassic Park (handheld game)]] - Designed by THQ for the original Game Boy and based (albeit very loosely) on the novel. Another handheld version, The Lost World: Jurassic Park by Sega, was also the final game released in North America for the Sega Game Gear, released in August 1997.
 The Lost World: Jurassic Park (pinball) - a 1997 pinball game designed by John Borg and released by Sega Pinball.
 Chaos Island: The Lost World Jurassic Park - A PC video game released in 1997 to coincide with the release of the film. It is a strategy role-playing video game, where the player controls characters displayed on a map, directing where they move with the mouse and giving them commands either with the mouse or from a menu.
 Trespasser - A first person shooter for the PC released in 1998.